Citadelle d'Ajaccio is a fortress in Corse-du-Sud, France. It was built in 1492.

References

Ajaccio
Buildings and structures completed in 1492